Plaka is the chief town in Milos, a Greek island in the Cyclades group. It is perched on the top of large rock, overlooking the gulf of Milos. No cars can enter the village because of the narrow spaces between walls and buildings. Motorbikes, mopeds and the like are the only usable vehicles.

External links
Plaka at Milos Island website

Milos
Populated places in Milos (regional unit)